Thomas Bishop (born 9 July 1991) is a British triathlete. He has represented England at the 2018 Commonwealth Games and finished in 7th place in the 2017 ITU World Triathlon Series overall standings. Originally from Derby, Bishop graduated from the University of Leeds and is now based in the city, training at the Leeds Triathlon Centre. He was part of the British mixed relay team that won gold at the 2016 Lisbon ETU European Championships and has achieved a number of podiums on both the international and European triathlon circuits, including silver at the ITU World Triathlon Abu Dhabi 2017.

Triathlon career 

Bishop has been racing competitive triathlon for over a decade and has enjoyed a huge amount of success during that time. Bursting onto the scene, Bishop took gold in his first international race at the 2008 Holten ETU Triathlon Junior European Cup when he was just 16. Two years later, Bishop worked his way to a world junior silver medal, taking 3rd place at the 2010 Nancy ETU Duathlon European Championships, 4th place at the 2010 Athlone ETU Triathlon European Championships and 2nd place at the 2010 ITU Triathlon World Championship Grand Final Budapest.

He found himself on the overall podium once more after graduating to U23 racing and Elite Men's races in 2011. He opened the year with a 5th-place finish whilst racing with the Elite Men at the 2011 Banyoles ITU Triathlon Premium European Cup. In September of the same year, Bishop earned the world U23 bronze medal after taking 3rd place at the 2011 ITU World Championship Grand Final Beijing.

The following year saw Bishop on the podium a total of five times, both at the U23 and Elite level. Success began in June for Bishop, winning the Elite Men's race at the 2012 Cremona ITU Sprint Triathlon European Cup and taking silver at the 2012 Holten ITU Triathlon Premium European Cup. He then travelled to Spain in September and took home two bronze medals, one in the U23 race at the 2012 Aguilas ETU Triathlon U23 and Youth European Championships and another in the mixed relay where he raced alongside his brother, David Bishop, as well as Lios Rosindale and Non Stanford. The year was brought to a close with another 3rd-place finish, this time at the 2012 Barfoot and Thompson World Triathlon Grand Final Auckland in which Bishop shared the U23 podium with Spain's Fernando Alarza and Australia's Aaron Royle.

In June, 2013, Bishop won the Leukaemia & Lymphoma Research Blenheim Palace Triathlon, finishing in just over one hour.

Throughout the next few years, Bishop recorded a number of high profile, top ten finishes as he worked his transitioned out of U23 racing and into Elite Men's. Recording 6th-place finishes at the 2014 Mooloolaba ITU Triathlon World Cup and 2014 Madrid ETU Triathlon European Cup Final, Bishop also reached 5th at the 2015 Geneva ETU Triathlon European Championships and secured a bronze medal in the mixed relay at the same event, racing alongside Jodie Stimpson, Lucy Hall and Matthew Sharp for Great Britain.

The following year saw Bishop take home gold at the 2016 Lisbon ETU Triathlon European Championships after the Great Britain mixed relay team, made up of Bishop, Lucy Hall, India Lee and Grant Sheldon beat out Russia by 5 seconds.

Bishop found himself on the podium again in 2017 when he finished in ahead of France's Vincent Luis to take home the silver at the 2017 ITU World Triathlon Abu Dhabi. The same year also saw a number of top-ten finishes from Bishop including a 5th-place finish on home soil at the 2017 ITU World Triathlon Leeds. Bishop ended 2017 ranked seventh in the world, many referring to this year as his breakthrough season.

In 2018, Bishop again found success in England, racing as part of another successful mixed relay team. This time being joined by Non Stanford, Vicky Holland and Jonathan Brownlee, Great Britain raced to a 2nd-place finish at the 2018 ITU World Triathlon Mixed Relay Series Nottingham. This was part of a busy year for Bishop, as he travelled to the 2018 Gold Coast Commonwealth Games in April, finishing 19th.

Bishops strongest performances in 2019 came at the 2019 Daman World Triathlon Abu Dhabi in which he placed 9th in the Elite Men's race and 7th in the mixed relay.

Personal life 

Bishop began triathlon as a twelve-year-old after he and his brother grew up surrounded by sport. Bishop often played football and cricket at school and even took part in archery and karate before taking up cross country running with his brother.

Speaking about the influence of his parents on his sporting success, Bishop said: "We did sport all the time as kids but our parents were never pushy, they just wanted us to have fun. I think that’s the best for development because you actually learn to love your sport rather than it be forced upon you".

Triathlon competitions 
The following list is based upon the official ITU rankings and the ITU's Athlete Profiles. Unless indicated otherwise, the following events are triathlons in the Elite Men's category.

References 

English male triathletes
1991 births
Living people